Reticulon-3 is a protein that in humans is encoded by the RTN3 gene.

The reticulons are a group of highly conserved genes with preferential expression in neuroendocrine tissues (see, e.g., RTN1; MIM 600865).[supplied by OMIM]

References

Further reading

External links